Péter Nagy (born 17 March 1992) is a Hungarian tennis player and coach, who is current coach the current Hungarian number 1 player, Márton Fucsovics.

Nagy has a career high ATP singles ranking of 409 achieved on 15 May 2017. He also has a career high ATP doubles ranking of 283 achieved on 10 December 2018. Nagy has won three ITF singles titles and thirteen doubles titles.

Playing for Hungary in Davis Cup, Nagy has a W/L record of 4–5.

Future and Challenger finals

Singles: 11 (3–8)

Doubles 31 (13–18)

Record against other players

Nagy's match record against players who have been ranked in the top 100, with those who are active in boldface. 
ATP Tour, Challenger and Future tournaments' main draw and qualifying matches are considered.

Davis Cup

Participations: (4–6)

   indicates the outcome of the Davis Cup match followed by the score, date, place of event, the zonal classification and its phase, and the court surface.

References

External links

1992 births
Living people
Hungarian male tennis players
Tennis players from Budapest
Texas A&M–Corpus Christi Islanders men's tennis players
20th-century Hungarian people
21st-century Hungarian people